Groveland Station is a census-designated place (CDP) in Livingston County, New York, United States. The CDP consists of the hamlet of Groveland and nearby residential areas. The CDP population was 281 as of the 2010 census. New York State Route 63 passes through the community.

History
The Sparta First Presbyterian Church at the junction of Groveland Scottsburg Road and Groveland Hill Road was added to the National Register of Historic Places in 2007.

Geography
The Groveland Station CDP is in south-central Livingston County, primarily in the town of Groveland but extending south into the town of Sparta. State Route 63 leads north  to Geneseo, the Livingston county seat, and south  to Dansville. State Route 258 leads west from Groveland Station  to State Route 36, less than a mile from Exit 6 on Interstate 390.

The western border of the CDP follows Canaseraga Creek, which flows northwest to the Genesee River.

Demographics

References

Hamlets in Livingston County, New York
Hamlets in New York (state)
Census-designated places in Livingston County, New York
Census-designated places in New York (state)